The Venetulani number among the 53 peoples of Latium Vetus that Pliny the Elder records as having perished without leaving a trace (interiere sine vestigiis). They are counted among the 30 Alban communities that carried out sacrificial activities on Mons Albanus. The name derives from a Veneti settlement which may have been called Venetulum.

See also 
Old Latium
Adriatic Veneti
Pliny the Elder
List of ancient peoples of Italy

Notes

Further reading 
 

Ancient peoples of Italy